"Faith Can Move Mountains" is a song that was recorded by Johnnie Ray and the Four Lads in 1952. It was written by Guy Wood with words by Ben Raleigh.

Chart performance
The single, backed with "Love Me (Baby Can't You Love Me)| reached number 20 on the US Cashbox chart. In the UK, it peaked at number seven on the UK Singles Chart.

References 

1952 singles
Johnnie Ray songs
The Four Lads songs
Songs written by Guy Wood
Songs with lyrics by Ben Raleigh
1952 songs